Dynamite Clothing (stylized as DYNAMITE) is a clothing store catered to women between the ages of 25 and 30 years old. Founded in 1984 as a subsidiary of Groupe Dynamite, Dynamite currently has locations in Canada, the United States, Jordan and Saudi Arabia. Alongside its sister brand, Garage, Dynamite has been recognized as one of Canada's Top Employers for young people in 2019. The current CEO, Andrew Lutfy, has started working at Groupe Dynamite at the age of 18 and was one of the creators of the Dynamite clothing brand. Dynamite contributes to the CURE Foundation, a Canadian foundation that provides funding for basic and clinical research for breast cancer. On September 8, 2020, it was announced that Groupe Dynamite filed for creditor protection in Canada as well as Chapter 15 in the United States.

History
The first Dynamite store opened in Carrefour Laval in 1984.  , the company had 127 stores in 5 countries (117 in Canada, four in the United States, three in Saudi Arabia, two in Kuwait, and one in Jordan).

References

External links
 

1984 establishments in Quebec
Clothing brands
Clothing retailers of Canada
Companies based in Montreal
Retail companies established in 1984